Besides the 18 islands of the Faroes there are also several islets and skerries. The Faroe Islands consist of 18 islands with many small islets and skerries. islets are small and are geographical parts of the larger islands. Suðuroy consists of 263 islands, islets and skerries, which is the largest number. The islets are measured in square hectometers (hectares), the largest being comparable in size to the smallest island, Lítla Dímun.

Largest islets:
 Tindhólmur (65,0 sq hm), at Sørvágur Vágar
 Mykineshólmur (45,0 sq hm), at Mykines
 Trøllhøvdi (19,0 sq hm), at Skopun Sandoy
 Gáshólmur (10,0 sq hm), at Sørvágur Vágar
 Tjaldavíkshólmur (7,5 sq hm), at Øravík Suðuroy
 Sumbiarhólmur (7,0 sq hm), at Sumba Suðuroy
 Lopranshólmur (3,4 sq hm), at Lopra Suðuroy
 Kirkjubøhólmur (2,0 sq hm), at Kirkjubøur Streymoy
 Hovshólmur (1,7 sq hm), at Hov Suðuroy
 Hoyvíkshólmur (0,8 sq hm), at Hoyvík Streymoy
 Baglhólmur (0,8 sq hm), at Víkarbyrgi Suðuroy
 Grønhólmur, (0,4 sq hm), at Streymnes Streymoy

Besides these islets there are also numerous skerries around the Faroes. The most famous is probably Sumbiarsteinur (also known as Munkurin in the south of Suðuroy. Munkurin means the Monk, the name is referring to the fact that Sumbiarsteinur is lying to itself, while the other skerries are close together. This group of skerries are called Flesjarnar. Munkurin is the southernmost point of the Faroes at 61° 10' 30".85 N, 6° 40' 23".77 W. Flesjarnar can be seen from Sumba, Akraberg and from Eggjarnar and other high places in Suðuroy.

References

External links 

Islets of the Faroe Islands